Aceperone is a neuroleptic drug of the butyrophenone class.  It is an α-noradrenergic blocking drug developed by Janssen Pharmaceutica in the 1960s.

Aceperone has been used as a tool in the study of the biochemical basis of learning. Although aceperone does not block learning per se, it blocks access to an attentional mechanism by which animals ‘tune in’ to the relevant visual dimension when learning a visual discrimination task at doses below those that affect general behaviour.

Synthesis

The reduction of 1-Benzyl-4-cyano-4-phenylpiperidine [56243-25-5] (1) with lithium aluminium hydride gives 1-Benzyl-4-phenylpiperidine-4-methylamine [84176-77-2] (2). Acetylation of this primary amine would yield [7152-05-8] (3). The removal of the benzyl protecting group by catalytic hydrogenation gives N-[(4-phenyl-4-piperidinyl)methyl]acetamide [83763-23-9] (4). Alkylation with 4-Chloro-4'-Fluorobutyrophenone [3874-54-2] (5) affords aceperone (6).

References 

Acetamides
Butyrophenone antipsychotics
Fluoroarenes
4-Phenylpiperidines
Typical antipsychotics